Henri Malo (4 March 1868 in Boulogne-sur-Mer) – 17 March 1948 in Chantilly. was a French writer.

He was the auditor of the École Nationale des Chartes, he was librarian at the Thiers library in Paris, then assistant curator at the Musée Condé, Chantilly from 1931 until his death.

A street in Boulogne-sur-mer bears his name.

Works
 Les annees de boheme de la Duchesse d'Abrantes    1927  Editions Emile Paul Freres 
 The Corsairs.  Dunkirk privateers and Jean Bart, Paris, Mercure de France, 1912
 Our three northern ports.  Dunkirk, Calais, Boulogne, Paris, Wiley, 1920.
 Corsairs: memoirs and unpublished documents.
 The Tender Love of Don Luis, Paris, Editions Bernard Grasset, 1924.
 The beautiful Montrond, Paris, Editions Emile-Paul Freres, 1926.
 Jean Bart, Paris, The Renaissance Book Publishing, 1929, collection, The Great legend of the sea.
 The Château de Chantilly, Paris, Calmann-Levy, 1938
 Police intervenes, 1790-1850, St. Wandrille, Fontenelle Publishing, 1946.
 The Bourdon of Notre Dame, Toulouse, Editions Privat

References

External links
 
 Henri Malo on data.bnf.fr

20th-century French non-fiction writers
People from Boulogne-sur-Mer
1868 births
1948 deaths
20th-century French male writers